Mychal "Mike" Cook is a Canadian retired soccer player who spent his career in the USISL.  He is the head coach of the Central Oklahoma Bronchos women's soccer team.

Player
1984–1985 Cook attended Bethany Nazarene College, playing on the men's soccer team in 1984 and 1985.  In 1986, Cook joined the newly created Oklahoma City Warriors of the Southwest Indoor Soccer League.  The Warriors finished third in the regular season, falling to the Lubbock Lazers in the first round of the playoffs.  During the 1987–88 Southwest Indoor Soccer League, Cook finished fifth on the scoring list with twenty-seven goals.  The Warriors again made the playoffs, winning the league championship over the Austin Sockadillos.  Cook was the playoff MVP.  Cook continued his scoring pace during the 1988–89 Southwest Indoor Soccer League season with twenty-five goals.  In August 1990, Cook joined the Colorado Comets as they prepared for the 1990 playoffs.  The Comets went on to win the championship after which Cook returned to the Warriors for the 1990–91 indoor season.  During the 1991–92 indoor season, Cook scored twenty goals in twelve games.  In February 1993, the Warriors merged with the Oklahoma City Spirit for the upcoming 1993 outdoor season.  The combined team was renamed the Oklahoma City Slickers.  Cook played for the Slickers from at least May 1993 through the 1995 outdoor season.  Cook then played for the reconstituted Oklahoma City Warriors during the 1997–98 USISL I-League

In 2006, Cook was inducted into the USL Hall of Fame.

Coach
Even during his playing career, Cook also coached at the collegiate level.  In 1987, he became an assistant with his alma mater, now known as Southern Nazarene University.  In 1993, he became the head coach of both the men's and women's teams.  In his five seasons as head coach, Cook took the men's team to a 58–44–2 record and the women to an 88–22–1 record.  In 1998, the University of Central Oklahoma hired Cook to establish a women's soccer team.  From 1998 to 2012, he led the team to a 230–75–19 record.

Head coaching record

Men's soccer

Women's soccer

External links
 Central Oklahoma: Mike Cook

References

Living people
Canadian soccer coaches
Canadian soccer players
Canadian expatriate soccer players
Colorado Comets players
Oklahoma City Warriors players
Oklahoma City Slickers (USISL) players
USISL players
USL League Two players
Year of birth missing (living people)
Soccer players from Toronto
Southern Nazarene University alumni
Southern Nazarene Crimson Storm men's soccer players
Southern Nazarene Crimson Storm men's soccer coaches
Southern Nazarene Crimson Storm women's soccer coaches
Central Oklahoma Bronchos women's soccer coaches
Association football midfielders
Association football forwards